Annelies Cook (born August 1, 1984) is a former American biathlete who has been a member of the national team since 2009.

Career
Cook is originally from Saranac Lake, New York She raced for the Maine Winter Sports Center. She then earned a bachelor's degree in international studies at the University of Utah.

At the 2013 Biathlon World Championships, Cook finished 38th in the women's 15km individual race, tied for 45th in the 7.5km sprint, and 51st in the 10km pursuit. She was also on the American mixed relay team that placed 8th at the 2013 World Championships. She was a member of the 2014 Winter Olympics team.

After her career as a competitive athlete, Annelies Cook began training at the School of Nursing at the Asklepios Stadtklinik in Bad Tölz, which she left in 2019 as a qualified health and nursing professional.

References

External links
 
 
 
 
 
 

1984 births
American female biathletes
Biathletes at the 2014 Winter Olympics
Living people
Olympic biathletes of the United States
People from Saranac Lake, New York
21st-century American women